Night Over Water is a thriller novel written by author Ken Follett in 1991.

Night Over Water is a fictionalized account of the final flight of the Pan American Clipper passenger airplane during the first few days of World War II, early September, 1939. Follett is careful to state that, though the flight and all of the characters are fictional the plane, a Boeing 314, was real and was nicknamed the "Pan Am Clipper." It was a seaplane, an aircraft that landed in the sea, not on an airstrip, powered by 4 propeller engines. It was capable of crossing the Atlantic Ocean in little more than 24 hours with intermediate stops in Shannon Estuary at Foynes, Ireland, Bay of Exploits at Botwood, Newfoundland and Shediac Bay, Canada, at each of which stops Follett adds a scene or two of intrigue. This route made the Pan Am Clipper the fastest mode of transatlantic travel at the time — and very appealing to those who wanted to escape from Britain before the start of the war.

The tale begins with several separated threads, telling the individual stories of the people who later all end up in this last flight to New York. Though Follett manages to bundle all these together, the events the characters share while travelling with the clipper are still told through the perspectives introduced before. Each of these main characters is heading for his own interests in the beginning but soon they melt together.

The theme is the importance of recognizing the threat of totalitarianism and also a feminist message of women standing up for themselves.

List of Characters 
 Tom Luther - enigmatic passenger with a mystery mission to kidnap a fleeing passenger
 Eddie Deakin - flight engineer being blackmailed by the kidnapping of his wife into helping Tom Luther
 Carl Hartmann - German Jewish physicist fleeing Nazis
 Clive Membury - British passenger
 Baron Gabon - French Jewish aristocrat helping Carl Hartmann flee
 The Oxenfords (Lord, Lady, Elizabeth, Percy, Margaret) - wealthy English family. Lord Oxenford is a Nazi sympathizer who will be arrested if he remains in England another week. Margaret is his 19-year-old rebellious daughter. Lady Oxenford is traveling with the priceless Delhi Suite jewels.
 Harry Marks - charming young lower class English jewel thief jumping bail to America
 Diana Lovesey - beautiful 34-year-old Englishwoman running away from an unhappy marriage
 Mark Alder - 35-year-old American radio scriptwriter running away with Diana Lovesey, friend of Lulu Bell
 Mervyn Lovesey - Diana's 38-year-old handsome but controlling British industrialist husband who wants his wife back
 Nancy Lenehan - tough-minded 40-year-old American businesswoman rushing home to save her shoe factory from being sold off by her sneaky younger brother falls in love with Mervyn Lovesey
 Peter Black -  38-year-old brother of Nancy Lenehan, racing to a board meeting to vote his sister out
 Nat Ridgeway - Nancy's mentor in business and former beau
 Captain Marvin Baker - Clipper pilot
 First Officer Johnny Dott - Clipper co-pilot
 Mickey Finn - Eddie Deakin's deputy flight engineer
 Lulu Bell - famous American actress
 Princess Lavinia - Russian princess escaping to America
 Steve Appleby - Eddie Deakin's old Navy buddy
 Vincini, Joe and Kid - thugs who kidnapped Eddie's wife
 Ollis Field - F.B.I. agent escorting the extradited Frank Gordon to America
 Frank Gordon A.K.A. Frankie Gordino - handsome American mobster, wanted in the US for rape, murder and arson

External links
 Ken Follett's Night Over Water - official site

1991 British novels
Novels set during World War II
Novels by Ken Follett
Fiction set in 1939
Aviation novels
Macmillan Publishers books